Odysseus, also known by the Latin variant Ulysses, is a legendary Greek king of Ithaca and the hero of Homer's epic poem the Odyssey. Odysseus also plays a key role in Homer's Iliad and other works in that same epic cycle.

Son of Laërtes and Anticlea, husband of Penelope, and father of Telemachus and Acusilaus, Odysseus is renowned for his intellectual brilliance, guile, and versatility (polytropos), and is thus known by the epithet Odysseus the Cunning. He is most famous for his nostos, or "homecoming", which took him ten eventful years after the decade-long Trojan War.

Name, etymology, and epithets 
The form  Odys(s)eus is used starting in the epic period and through the classical period, but various other forms are also found. In vase inscriptions, we find the variants Oliseus, Olyseus, Olysseus, Olyteus, Olytteus and Ōlysseus. The form Oulixēs is attested in an early source in Magna Graecia (Ibycus, according to Diomedes Grammaticus), while the Greek grammarian Aelius Herodianus has Oulixeus. Some have supposed that "there may originally have been two separate figures, one called something like Odysseus, the other something like Ulixes, who were combined into one complex personality." However, the change between d and l is common also in some Indo-European and Greek names, and the Latin form is supposed to be derived from the Etruscan  (see below), which perhaps accounts for some of the phonetic innovations.

The etymology of the name is unknown. Ancient authors linked the name to the Greek verbs  “to be wroth against, to hate”, to  “to lament, bewail”, or even to  “to perish, to be lost”. Homer relates it to various forms of this verb in references and puns. In Book 19 of the Odyssey, where Odysseus' early childhood is recounted, Euryclea asks the boy's grandfather Autolycus to name him. Euryclea seems to suggest a name like Polyaretos, "for he has much been prayed for" (πολυάρητος)  but Autolycus "apparently in a sardonic mood" decided to give the child another name commemorative of "his own experience in life": "Since I have been angered (ὀδυσσάμενος odyssamenos) with many, both men and women, let the name of the child be Odysseus". Odysseus often receives the patronymic epithet Laertiades, "son of Laërtes". 

It has also been suggested that the name is of non-Greek origin, possibly not even Indo-European, with an unknown etymology. Robert S. P. Beekes has suggested a Pre-Greek origin. In Etruscan religion the name (and stories) of Odysseus were adopted under the name  (Uθuze), which has been interpreted as a parallel borrowing from a preceding Minoan form of the name (possibly *Oduze, pronounced /'ot͡θut͡se/); this theory is supposed to explain also the insecurity of the phonologies (d or l), since the affricate /t͡θ/, unknown to the Greek of that time, gave rise to different counterparts (i. e. δ or λ in Greek, θ in Etruscan).

In the Iliad and Odyssey Homer uses several epithets used to describe Odysseus, starting with the opening, where he is described as "the man of many devices" (in the 1919 Murray translation). The Greek word used is  πολύτροπον, literally the man of many turns, and other translators have suggested alternate English translations, including "man of twists and turns" (Fagles 1996) and "a complicated man" (Wilson 2018).

Description 
In the account of Dares the Phrygian, Odysseus was illustrated as ". . .tough, crafty, cheerful, of medium height, eloquent, and wise."

Genealogy 
Relatively little is given of Odysseus' fictional background other than that according to Pseudo-Apollodorus, his paternal grandfather or step-grandfather is Arcesius, son of Cephalus and grandson of Aeolus, while his maternal grandfather is the thief Autolycus, son of Hermes and Chione. Hence, Odysseus was the great-grandson of the Olympian god Hermes.

According to the Iliad and Odyssey, his father is Laertes and his mother Anticlea, although there was a non-Homeric tradition that Sisyphus was his true father. The rumour went that Laërtes bought Odysseus from the conniving king. Odysseus is said to have a younger sister, Ctimene, who went to Same to be married and is mentioned by the swineherd Eumaeus, whom she grew up alongside, in book 15 of the Odyssey.

Mythology

Before the Trojan War 
The majority of sources for Odysseus' supposed pre-war exploits—principally the mythographers Pseudo-Apollodorus and Hyginus—postdate Homer by many centuries. Two stories in particular are well known:

When Helen of Troy is abducted, Menelaus calls upon the other suitors to honour their oaths and help him to retrieve her, an attempt that leads to the Trojan War. Odysseus tries to avoid it by feigning lunacy, as an oracle had prophesied a long-delayed return home for him if he went. He hooks a donkey and an ox to his plow (as they have different stride lengths, hindering the efficiency of the plow) and (some modern sources add) starts sowing his fields with salt. Palamedes, at the behest of Menelaus' brother Agamemnon, seeks to disprove Odysseus' madness and places Telemachus, Odysseus' infant son, in front of the plow. Odysseus veers the plow away from his son, thus exposing his stratagem. Odysseus holds a grudge against Palamedes during the war for dragging him away from his home.

Odysseus and other envoys of Agamemnon travel to Scyros to recruit Achilles because of a prophecy that Troy could not be taken without him. By most accounts, Thetis, Achilles' mother, disguises the youth as a woman to hide him from the recruiters because an oracle had predicted that Achilles would either live a long uneventful life or achieve everlasting glory while dying young. Odysseus cleverly discovers which among the women before him is Achilles when the youth is the only one of them to show interest in examining the weapons hidden among an array of adornment gifts for the daughters of their host. Odysseus arranges further for the sounding of a battle horn, which prompts Achilles to clutch a weapon and show his trained disposition. With his disguise foiled, he is exposed and joins Agamemnon's call to arms among the Hellenes.

During the Trojan War

The Iliad 

Odysseus is represented as one of the most influential Greek champions during the Trojan War in Homer's fictional account. Along with Nestor and Idomeneus he is one of the most trusted counsellors and advisors. He always champions the Achaean cause, especially when others question Agamemnon's command, as in one instance when Thersites speaks against him. When Agamemnon, to test the morale of the Achaeans, announces his intentions to depart Troy, Odysseus restores order to the Greek camp. Later on, after many of the heroes leave the battlefield due to injuries (including Odysseus and Agamemnon), Odysseus once again persuades Agamemnon not to withdraw. Along with two other envoys, he is chosen in the failed embassy to try to persuade Achilles to return to combat.

When Hector proposes a single combat duel, Odysseus is one of the Danaans who reluctantly volunteered to battle him. Telamonian Ajax ("The Greater"), however, is the volunteer who eventually fights Hector. Odysseus aids Diomedes during the night operations to kill Rhesus, because it had been foretold that if his horses drank from the Scamander River, Troy could not be taken.

After Patroclus is slain, it is Odysseus who counsels Achilles to let the Achaean men eat and rest rather than follow his rage-driven desire to go back on the offensive—and kill Trojans—immediately. Eventually (and reluctantly), he consents. During the funeral games for Patroclus, Odysseus becomes involved in a wrestling match with Ajax "The Greater" and foot race with Ajax "The Lesser," son of Oileus and Nestor's son Antilochus. He draws the wrestling match, and with the help of the goddess Athena, he wins the race.

Odysseus has traditionally been viewed as Achilles' antithesis in the Iliad: while Achilles' anger is all-consuming and of a self-destructive nature, Odysseus is frequently viewed as a man of the mean, a voice of reason, renowned for his self-restraint and diplomatic skills. He is also in some respects antithetical to Telamonian Ajax (Shakespeare's "beef-witted" Ajax): while the latter has only brawn to recommend him, Odysseus is not only ingenious (as evidenced by his idea for the Trojan Horse), but an eloquent speaker, a skill perhaps best demonstrated in the embassy to Achilles in book 9 of the Iliad. The two are not only foils in the abstract but often opposed in practice since they have many duels and run-ins.

Other stories from the Trojan War 

Since a prophecy suggested that the Trojan War would not be won without Achilles, Odysseus and several other Achaean leaders are described in the Achilleid as having gone to Skyros to find him. Odysseus discovered Achilles by offering gifts, adornments and musical instruments as well as weapons, to the king's daughters, and then having his companions imitate the noises of an enemy's attack on the island (most notably, making a blast of a trumpet heard), which prompted Achilles to reveal himself by picking a weapon to fight back, and together they departed for the Trojan War.

The story of the death of Palamedes has many versions. According to some, Odysseus never forgives Palamedes for unmasking his feigned madness and plays a part in his downfall. One tradition says Odysseus convinces a Trojan captive to write a letter pretending to be from Palamedes. A sum of gold is mentioned to have been sent as a reward for Palamedes' treachery. Odysseus then kills the prisoner and hides the gold in Palamedes' tent. He ensures that the letter is found and acquired by Agamemnon, and also gives hints directing the Argives to the gold. This is evidence enough for the Greeks, and they have Palamedes stoned to death. Other sources say that Odysseus and Diomedes goad Palamedes into descending a well with the prospect of treasure being at the bottom. When Palamedes reaches the bottom, the two proceed to bury him with stones, killing him.

When Achilles is slain in battle by Paris, it is Odysseus and Ajax who  retrieve the fallen warrior's body and armour in the thick of heavy fighting. During the funeral games for Achilles, Odysseus competes once again with Ajax. Thetis says that the arms of Achilles will go to the bravest of the Greeks, but only these two warriors dare lay claim to that title. The two Argives became embroiled in a heavy dispute about one another's merits to receive the reward. The Greeks dither out of fear in deciding a winner, because they did not want to insult one and have him abandon the war effort. Nestor suggests that they allow the captive Trojans to decide the winner. The accounts of the Odyssey disagree, suggesting that the Greeks themselves hold a secret vote. In any case, Odysseus is the winner. Enraged and humiliated, Ajax is driven mad by Athena. When he returns to his senses, in shame at how he has slaughtered livestock in his madness, Ajax kills himself by the sword that Hector had given him after their duel.

Together with Diomedes, Odysseus fetches Achilles' son, Pyrrhus, to come to the aid of the Achaeans, because an oracle had stated that Troy could not be taken without him. A great warrior, Pyrrhus is also called Neoptolemus (Greek for "new warrior"). Upon the success of the mission, Odysseus gives Achilles' armour to him.

It is learned that the war can not be won without the poisonous arrows of Heracles, which are owned by the abandoned Philoctetes. Odysseus and Diomedes (or, according to some accounts, Odysseus and Neoptolemus) leave to retrieve them. Upon their arrival, Philoctetes (still suffering from the wound) is seen still to be enraged at the Danaans, especially at Odysseus, for abandoning him. Although his first instinct is to shoot Odysseus, his anger is eventually diffused by Odysseus' persuasive powers and the influence of the gods. Odysseus returns to the Argive camp with Philoctetes and his arrows.

Perhaps Odysseus' most famous contribution to the Greek war effort is devising the strategy of the Trojan Horse, which allows the Greek army to sneak into Troy under cover of darkness. It is built by Epeius and filled with Greek warriors, led by Odysseus. Odysseus and Diomedes steal the Palladium that lay within Troy's walls, for the Greeks were told they could not sack the city without it. Some late Roman sources indicate that Odysseus schemed to kill his partner on the way back, but Diomedes thwarts this attempt.

"Cruel, deceitful Ulixes" of the Romans 
Homer's Iliad and Odyssey portray Odysseus as a culture hero, but the Romans, who believed themselves the heirs of Prince Aeneas of Troy, considered him a villainous falsifier. In Virgil's Aeneid, written between 29 and 19 BC, he is constantly referred to as "cruel Odysseus" (Latin dirus Ulixes) or "deceitful Odysseus" (pellacis, fandi fictor). Turnus, in Aeneid, book 9, reproaches the Trojan Ascanius with images of rugged, forthright Latin virtues, declaring (in John Dryden's translation), "You shall not find the sons of Atreus here, nor need the frauds of sly Ulysses fear." While the Greeks admired his cunning and deceit, these qualities did not recommend themselves to the Romans, who possessed a rigid sense of honour. In Euripides' tragedy Iphigenia at Aulis, having convinced Agamemnon to consent to the sacrifice of his daughter, Iphigenia, to appease the goddess Artemis, Odysseus facilitates the immolation by telling Iphigenia's mother, Clytemnestra, that the girl is to be wed to Achilles. Odysseus' attempts to avoid his sacred oath to defend Menelaus and Helen offended Roman notions of duty, and the many stratagems and tricks that he employed to get his way offended Roman notions of honour.

Journey home to Ithaca 

Odysseus is probably best known as the eponymous hero of the Odyssey. This epic describes his travails, which lasted for 10 years, as he tries to return home after the Trojan War and reassert his place as rightful king of Ithaca.

Homebound from Troy, after a raid on Ismarus in the land of the Cicones, he and his twelve ships are driven off course by storms. They visit the lethargic Lotus-Eaters and are captured by the Cyclops Polyphemus while visiting his island. After Polyphemus eats several of his men, he and Odysseus have a discussion and Odysseus tells Polyphemus his name is Outis ("Nobody"). Odysseus takes a barrel of wine and the Cyclops drinks it, falling asleep. Odysseus and his men take a wooden stake, ignite it with the remaining wine, and blind him. While they escape, Polyphemus cries in pain, and the other Cyclopes ask him what is wrong. Polyphemus cries, "Nobody has blinded me!" and the other Cyclopes think he has gone mad. Odysseus and his crew escape, but Odysseus rashly reveals his real name, and Polyphemus prays to Poseidon, his father, to take revenge. They stay with Aeolus, the master of the winds, who gives Odysseus a leather bag containing all the winds, except the west wind, a gift that should have ensured a safe return home. However, the sailors foolishly open the bag while Odysseus sleeps, thinking that it contains gold. All of the winds fly out, and the resulting storm drives the ships back the way they had come, just as Ithaca comes into sight.

After pleading in vain with Aeolus to help them again, they re-embark and encounter the cannibalistic Laestrygonians. Odysseus' ship is the only one to escape. He sails on and visits the witch-goddess Circe. She turns half of his men into swine after feeding them cheese and wine. Hermes warns Odysseus about Circe and gives him a drug called moly, which resists Circe's magic. Circe, being attracted to Odysseus' resistance, falls in love with him and releases his men. Odysseus and his crew remain with her on the island for one year, while they feast and drink. Finally, Odysseus' men convince him to leave for Ithaca.

Guided by Circe's instructions, Odysseus and his crew cross the ocean and reach a harbor at the western edge of the world, where Odysseus sacrifices to the dead and summons the spirit of the old prophet Tiresias for advice. Next Odysseus meets the spirit of his own mother, who had died of grief during his long absence. From her, he learns for the first time news of his own household, threatened by the greed of Penelope's suitors. Odysseus also talks to his fallen war comrades and the mortal shade of Heracles.

Odysseus and his men return to Circe's island, and she advises them on the remaining stages of the journey. They skirt the land of the Sirens, pass between the six-headed monster Scylla and the whirlpool Charybdis, where they row directly between the two. However, Scylla drags the boat towards her by grabbing the oars and eats six men.

They land on the island of Thrinacia. There, Odysseus' men ignore the warnings of Tiresias and Circe and hunt down the sacred cattle of the sun god Helios. Helios tells Zeus what happened and demands Odysseus' men be punished or else he will take the sun and shine it in the Underworld. Zeus fulfills Helios' demands by causing a shipwreck during a thunderstorm in which all but Odysseus drown. He washes ashore on the island of Ogygia, where Calypso compels him to remain as her lover for seven years, during which she rapes him. He finally escapes when Hermes tells Calypso to release Odysseus.

Odysseus is shipwrecked and befriended by the Phaeacians. After he tells them his story, the Phaeacians, led by King Alcinous, agree to help Odysseus get home. They deliver him at night, while he is fast asleep, to a hidden harbor on Ithaca. He finds his way to the hut of one of his own former slaves, the swineherd Eumaeus, and also meets up with Telemachus returning from Sparta. Athena disguises Odysseus as a wandering beggar to learn how things stand in his household.

When the disguised Odysseus returns after 20 years, he is recognized only by his faithful dog, Argos. Penelope announces in her long interview with the disguised hero that whoever can string Odysseus' rigid bow and shoot an arrow through twelve axe shafts may have her hand. According to Bernard Knox, "For the plot of the Odyssey, of course, her decision is the turning point, the move that makes possible the long-predicted triumph of the returning hero". Odysseus' identity is discovered by the housekeeper, Eurycleia, as she is washing his feet and discovers an old scar Odysseus received during a boar hunt. Odysseus swears her to secrecy, threatening to kill her if she tells anyone.

When the contest of the bow begins, none of the suitors are able to string the bow. After all the suitors have given up, the disguised Odysseus asks to participate. Though the suitors refuse at first, Penelope intervenes and allows the "stranger" (the disguised Odysseus) to participate. Odysseus easily strings his bow and wins the contest. Having done so, he proceeds to slaughter the suitors (beginning with Antinous whom he finds drinking from Odysseus' cup) with help from Telemachus and two of Odysseus' servants, Eumaeus the swineherd and Philoetius the cowherd. Odysseus tells the serving women who slept with the suitors to clean up the mess of corpses and then has those women hanged in terror. He tells Telemachus that he will replenish his stocks by raiding nearby islands. Odysseus has now revealed himself in all his glory (with a little makeover by Athena); yet Penelope cannot believe that her husband has really returned—she fears that it is perhaps some god in disguise, as in the story of Alcmene (mother of Heracles)—and tests him by ordering her servant Euryclea to move the bed in their wedding-chamber. Odysseus protests that this cannot be done since he made the bed himself and knows that one of its legs is a living olive tree. Penelope finally accepts that he truly is her husband, a moment that highlights their homophrosýnē (“like-mindedness”).

The next day Odysseus and Telemachus visit the country farm of his old father Laërtes. The citizens of Ithaca follow Odysseus on the road, planning to avenge the killing of the Suitors, their sons. The goddess Athena and the god Zeus intervene and persuade both sides to make peace.

Other tales 
According to some late sources, most of them purely genealogical, Odysseus had many other children besides Telemachus. Most such genealogies aimed to link Odysseus with the foundation of many Italic cities. The most famous being:

 with Penelope: Poliporthes (born after Odysseus' return from Troy)
 with Circe: Telegonus, Ardeas, Latinus, also Ausonus and Casiphone. Xenagoras writes that Odysseus with Circe had three sons, Romos, Anteias and Ardeias, who built three cities and called them after their own names. The city that Romos founded was Rome.
 with Calypso: Nausithous, Nausinous
 with Callidice: Polypoetes
 with Euippe: Euryalus
 with daughter of Thoas: Leontophonus

He figures in the end of the story of King Telephus of Mysia.

The supposed last poem in the Epic Cycle is called the Telegony and is thought to tell the story of Odysseus' last voyage, and of his death at the hands of Telegonus, his son with Circe. The poem, like the others of the cycle, is "lost" in that no authentic version has been discovered.

In 5th century BC Athens, tales of the Trojan War were popular subjects for tragedies. Odysseus figures centrally or indirectly in a number of the extant plays by Aeschylus, Sophocles (Ajax, Philoctetes) and Euripides (Hecuba, Rhesus, Cyclops) and figured in still more that have not survived. In his Ajax, Sophocles portrays Odysseus as a modern voice of reasoning compared to the title character's rigid antiquity.

Plato in his dialogue Hippias Minor examines a literary question about whom Homer intended to portray as the better man, Achilles or Odysseus.

Pausanias at the Description of Greece writes that at Pheneus there was a bronze statue of Poseidon, surnamed Hippios, meaning of horse, which according to the legends was dedicated by Odysseus and also a sanctuary of Artemis which was called Heurippa, meaning horse finder, and was founded by Odysseus. According to the legends Odysseus lost his mares and traversed the Greece in search of them. He found them on that site in Pheneus. Pausanias adds that according to the people of Pheneus, when Odysseus found his mares he decided to keep horses in the land of Pheneus, just as he reared his cows. The people of Pheneus also pointed out to him writing, purporting to be instructions of Odysseus to those tending his mares.

As Ulysses, he is mentioned regularly in Virgil's Aeneid written between 29 and 19 BC, and the poem's hero, Aeneas, rescues one of Ulysses' crew members who was left behind on the island of the Cyclopes. He in turn offers a first-person account of some of the same events Homer relates, in which Ulysses appears directly. Virgil's Ulysses typifies his view of the Greeks: he is cunning but impious, and ultimately malicious and hedonistic.

Ovid retells parts of Ulysses' journeys, focusing on his romantic involvements with Circe and Calypso, and recasts him as, in Harold Bloom's phrase, "one of the great wandering womanizers". Ovid also gives a detailed account of the contest between Ulysses and Ajax for the armour of Achilles.

Greek legend tells of Ulysses as the founder of Lisbon, Portugal, calling it Ulisipo or Ulisseya, during his twenty-year errand on the Mediterranean and Atlantic seas. Olisipo was Lisbon's name in the Roman Empire. This folk etymology is recounted by Strabo based on Asclepiades of Myrleia's words, by Pomponius Mela, by Gaius Julius Solinus (3rd century AD), and will be resumed by Camões in his epic poem Os Lusíadas (first printed in 1572).

In one version of Odysseus's end, he is eventually turned into a horse by Athena.

In post-classical tradition 
Odysseus is one of the most recurrent characters in Western culture.

Middle Ages and Renaissance
Dante Alighieri, in the Canto XXVI of the Inferno segment of his Divine Comedy (1308–1320), encounters Odysseus ("Ulisse" in Italian) near the very bottom of Hell: with Diomedes, he walks wrapped in flame in the eighth ring (Counselors of Fraud) of the Eighth Circle (Sins of Malice), as punishment for his schemes and conspiracies that won the Trojan War. In a famous passage, Dante has Odysseus relate a different version of his voyage and death from the one told by Homer. He tells how he set out with his men from Circe's island for a journey of exploration to sail beyond the Pillars of Hercules and into the Western sea to find what adventures awaited them. Men, says Ulisse, are not made to live like brutes, but to follow virtue and knowledge.

After travelling west and south for five months, they see in the distance a great mountain rising from the sea (this is Purgatory, in Dante's cosmology) before a storm sinks them. Dante did not have access to the original Greek texts of the Homeric epics, so his knowledge of their subject-matter was based only on information from later sources, chiefly Virgil's Aeneid but also Ovid; hence the discrepancy between Dante and Homer.

He appears in Shakespeare's Troilus and Cressida (1602), set during the Trojan War.

Modern literature

Poetry 

In her poem  (published in 1836), Letitia Elizabeth Landon gives her version of The Song of the Sirens with an explanation of its purpose, structure and meaning. This illustrates a painting by Charles Bentley engraved by R. Sands, and showing The Black Mountains of Cephalonia in the background. A further poetical illustration, also in Fisher's Drawing Room Scrap Book, 1837, is to an engraving of a painting by Charles Bentley,  and harks back to the island 'where Ulysses was king'.

Alfred, Lord Tennyson's poem "Ulysses" (published in 1842) presents an aging king who has seen too much of the world to be happy sitting on a throne idling his days away. Leaving the task of civilizing his people to his son, he gathers together a band of old comrades "to sail beyond the sunset".

Nikos Kazantzakis's The Odyssey: A Modern Sequel (1938), a 33,333-line epic poem, begins with Odysseus cleansing his body of the blood of Penelope's suitors. Odysseus soon leaves Ithaca in search of new adventures. Before his death he abducts Helen, incites revolutions in Crete and Egypt, communes with God, and meets representatives of such famous historical and literary figures as Vladimir Lenin, Don Quixote and Jesus.

In 1986, Irish poet Eilean Ni Chuilleanain published "The Second Voyage", a poem in which she makes use of the story of Odysseus.

Novels 

Frederick Rolfe's The Weird of the Wanderer (1912) has the hero Nicholas Crabbe (based on the author) travelling back in time, discovering that he is the reincarnation of Odysseus, marrying Helen, being deified and ending up as one of the three Magi.

James Joyce's novel Ulysses (first published 1918–1920) uses modern literary devices to narrate a single day in the life of a Dublin businessman named Leopold Bloom. Bloom's day turns out to bear many elaborate parallels to Odysseus' ten years of wandering.

Return to Ithaca (1946) by Eyvind Johnson is a more realistic retelling of the events that adds a deeper psychological study of the characters of Odysseus, Penelope, and Telemachus. Thematically, it uses Odysseus' backstory and struggle as a metaphor for dealing with the aftermath of war (the novel being written immediately after the end of the Second World War).

In the eleventh chapter of Primo Levi's 1947 memoir If This Is a Man, "The Canto of Ulysses", the author describes the last voyage of Ulysses as told by Dante in The Inferno to a fellow-prisoner during forced labour in the Nazi concentration camp Auschwitz.

Odysseus is the hero of The Luck of Troy (1961) by Roger Lancelyn Green, whose title refers to the theft of the Palladium.

In S. M. Stirling's Island in the Sea of Time (1998), first part to his Nantucket series of alternate history novels, Odikweos ("Odysseus" in Mycenaean Greek) is a "historical" figure who is every bit as cunning as his legendary self and is one of the few Bronze Age inhabitants who discerns the time-travellers' real background. Odikweos first aids William Walker's rise to power in Achaea and later helps bring Walker down after seeing his homeland turn into a police state.

The Penelopiad (2005) by Margaret Atwood retells his story from the point of view of his wife Penelope.

Literary criticism 

The literary theorist Núria Perpinyà conceived twenty different interpretations of the Odyssey in a 2008 study.

Television and film

The actors who have portrayed Odysseus in feature films include Kirk Douglas in the Italian Ulysses (1955), John Drew Barrymore in The Trojan Horse (1961), Piero Lulli in The Fury of Achilles (1962), and Sean Bean in Troy (2004).

In TV miniseries he has been played by Bekim Fehmiu in L'Odissea (1968), Armand Assante in The Odyssey (1997), and by Joseph Mawle in Troy: Fall of a City (2018).

Ulysses 31 is a French-Japanese animated television series (1981) that updates the Greek mythology of Odysseus to the 31st century.

Music

The British group Cream recorded the song "Tales of Brave Ulysses" in 1967 and the 2002 the U.S. progressive metal band Symphony X released a 24-minute adaption of the tale on their album The Odyssey. Suzanne Vega's song "Calypso" from 1987 album Solitude Standing shows Odysseus from Calypso's point of view, and tells the tale of him coming to the island and his leaving.

Rolf Riehm composed an opera based on the myth, Sirenen – Bilder des Begehrens und des Vernichtens (Sirens – Images of Desire and Destruction) which premiered at the Oper Frankfurt in 2014.

Odysseus is featured in a verse of the song 'Journey of the Magi' on Frank Turner's 2009 album Poetry of the Deed.

Comparative mythology and folkloristics 

Over time, comparisons between Odysseus and other heroes of different mythologies and religions have been made. A similar story exists in Hindu mythology with Nala and Damayanti where Nala separates from Damayanti and is reunited with her. The story of stringing a bow is similar to the description in the Ramayana of Rama stringing the bow to win Sita's hand in marriage.

The Odyssey has evident similarities to Virgil's Aeneid. Virgil tells the story of Aeneas and his travels to what would become Rome. On his journey he endures strife comparable to that of Odysseus. However, the motives for both of their journeys differ as Aeneas was driven by this sense of duty granted to him by the gods that he must abide by. He keeps in mind the future of his people, fitting for the future Father of Rome.

In folkloristics, the story of Odysseus's journey back to his native Ithaca and wife Penelope corresponds to the tale type ATU 974, of the international Aarne–Thompson–Uther Index for folktale classification.

Altars – islands – cities 

Strabo writes that on Meninx island, modern Djerba at Tunisia, there was an altar to Odysseus.

Pliny the Elder writes that in Italy there were some small islands (modern Torricella, Praca, Brace and other rocks) which were called Ithacesiae because of a watchtower that Odysseus built there.

According to ancient Greek tradition, Odysseus founded a city in Iberia which was called Odysseia (Ὀδύσσεια) or Odysseis (Ὀδυσσεῖς) which had a sanctuary of goddess Athena. Ancient authors identified it with Olisipo (modern Lisbon), but modern researchers believe that even its existence is uncertain.

Hellanicus of Lesbos wrote that Rome was founded by Aeneas and Odysseus who came together there. Other ancient historians, including Damastes of Sigeum, agreed with him.

Namesakes 
 Odysseus (crater)
 Prince Odysseas-Kimon of Greece and Denmark (born 2004), is the grandson of the deposed Greek king, Constantine II.
 1143 Odysseus

See also 

 Odysseus Unbound

References

Further reading 

 (Odysseus Unbound Foundation)

Garcin, Milan (2021). Ulysse: voyage dans une Méditerranée de légendes, Paris, Réunion des Musées Nationaux. Exhibition catalogue (HDE Var)

External links 

 "Archaeological discovery in Greece may be the tomb of Odysseus" from the Madera Tribune

Aeolides
Achaean Leaders
Kings in Greek mythology
Characters in the Odyssey
Greek mythological heroes
Heroes who ventured to Hades
Ithacan characters in Greek mythology
 
Deeds of Zeus
Helios in mythology
Deeds of Hermes
Mythological rape victims
Metamorphoses into animals in Greek mythology
Deeds of Athena
Deeds of Poseidon